Dominik Nothnagel (born 28 December 1994) is a German footballer who plays as a defensive midfielder for VfB Stuttgart II.

In 2011, he earned a single cap for the German national under-18 team. He made his professional debut in the 3. Liga on 20 July 2013 for Borussia Dortmund II against VfB Stuttgart II. A year later he signed for Würzburger Kickers.

References

External links
 
 

1994 births
Living people
Association football defenders
German footballers
Germany youth international footballers
Borussia Dortmund II players
Würzburger Kickers players
SV Wehen Wiesbaden players
FSV Frankfurt players
VfB Stuttgart II players
3. Liga players
Regionalliga players
Footballers from Stuttgart